Liriomyza flaveola is a species of fly from Liriomyza genus, Agromyzidae family. It was described for first time by Fallén in 1823. According to Catalogue of Life Liriomyza flaveola does not have known subspecies.

References 

Agromyzidae